Eulepte anticostalis is a moth in the family Crambidae. It was described by Augustus Radcliffe Grote in 1871. It is found in North America, where it has been recorded from Florida to North Carolina and west to Texas. It is also found on Puerto Rico.

The wingspan is 25–28 mm. Adults have been recorded on wing from April to May and from July to October.

References

Moths described in 1871
Spilomelinae
Moths of North America